Bidens heterosperma, the Rocky Mountain beggarticks, is a North American species of flowering plant in the family Asteraceae. It is native to northwestern and north-central Mexico (Baja California, Chihuahua, Sinaloa, Sonora) and the southeastern United States (Colorado, New Mexico, Arizona).

Bidens heterosperma is an annual herb up to 60 cm (2 feet) tall. It usually produces flower heads one at a time, each containing both yellow disc florets and yellow ray florets. The species usually grows in wet seeps on mountain slopes.

References

heterosperma
Flora of Mexico
Flora of the Southwestern United States
Plants described in 1853